Mowinckel is a Norwegian surname. Since the family was mainly involved with trade, many family members moved to trading centers in other countries to oversee the family interest there, and descendants can be found in the United States, Denmark, Venice and quite a few others.

Notable people
Notable people who have this surname include:
 Agnes Mowinckel (1875–1963), Norwegian actress
 Johan Ernst Mowinckel (born 1759) (1759–1816), Norwegian merchant and consul
 Johan Ernst Mowinckel (born 1860) (1860–1947), Norwegian merchant and politician
 Johan Ludwig Mowinckel (1870–1943), Norwegian politician
 Ragnhild Mowinckel (born 1992), Norwegian skier
 Sigmund Mowinckel (1884–1965), Norwegian scholar
 Thorolf Beyer Mowinckel (1884–1963), Norwegian politician

References